Choinière is a French surname. Notable people with the surname include:

David Choinière (born 1997), Canadian soccer player
Mathieu Choinière (born 1999), Canadian soccer player, brother of David
Olivier Choinière (born 1973), Canadian playwright

French-language surnames